Blackcomb Peak (Ucwalmícwts: Tsíqten) is a mountain located east of Whistler, British Columbia that forms the boundary between the Whistler Blackcomb ski resort and Garibaldi Provincial Park. Like Whistler Mountain, it is located on the edge of Garibaldi Provincial Park and the ski lifts are often used to access the park, particularly for the Spearhead Traverse.

Several ski runs are established on the mountain, with Whistler Village at the base of the mountain on the side facing Whistler Mountain, and Blackcomb Village below the opposite face. The 2010 Winter Olympics sliding sports took place on its slopes, at the Whistler Sliding Centre located on it.

Climate

Based on the Köppen climate classification, Blackcomb Peak is located in the marine west coast climate zone of western North America. Most weather fronts originate in the Pacific Ocean, and travel east toward the Coast Mountains where they are forced upward by the range (Orographic lift), causing them to drop their moisture in the form of rain or snowfall. As a result, the Coast Mountains experience high precipitation, especially during the winter months in the form of snowfall. Temperatures can drop below −20 °C with wind chill factors below −30 °C. The months July through September offer the most favorable weather for climbing Blackcomb Peak.

See also

 List of mountains of Canada
 Geography of British Columbia
 Geology of British Columbia

Gallery

References

Two-thousanders of British Columbia
Garibaldi Ranges
New Westminster Land District